Abdullah Al-Zawayed (born 1965) is a Saudi Arabian fencer. He competed in the individual foil event at the 1984 Summer Olympics.

References

External links
 

1965 births
Living people
Saudi Arabian male foil fencers
Olympic fencers of Saudi Arabia
Fencers at the 1984 Summer Olympics